Hazel A. McCaskrin (January 9, 1901 – December 2, 1954) was an American politician.

Background
Born in Tampico, Illinois, McCaskrin moved to Rock Island, Illinois and graduated from Rock Island High School. She was a Republican. McCaskrin was married to Harry M. McCaskrin, who served in the Illinois House of Representatives from 1921 to 1941. She also served as his secretary. McCaskrin also served in the Illinois House of Representatives from 1947 to 1949 and then from 1951 until her death in 1956. She represented the 33rd district. McCaskrin was killed in an auto accident near Long Grove, Illinois on December 2, 1954. She was reelected to office at the time of her death.

Notes

External links

1900s births
1954 deaths
Politicians from Rock Island, Illinois
People from Tampico, Illinois
Women state legislators in Illinois
Republican Party members of the Illinois House of Representatives
Road incident deaths in Illinois
20th-century American politicians
20th-century American women politicians